The Port Arthur massacre took place during the First Sino-Japanese War from 21 November 1894 for three days, when advance elements of the First Division of the Japanese Second Army under the command of General Yamaji Motoharu (1841–1897) killed somewhere between 2,600 civilians and 20,000 including Chinese soldiers in the Chinese coastal city of Port Arthur (now Lüshunkou District of Dalian, Liaoning). 

Reports of a massacre were first published by Canadian journalist James Creelman of the New York World, whose account was widely circulated within the United States.  In 1894, the State Department ordered its ambassador to Japan, Edwin Dun, to conduct an independent investigation of Creelman's reports.

Background

As part of its wartime strategy during the First Sino-Japanese War, Japan had advanced through Korea, engaging Chinese troops at Asan near Seoul and then Pyongyang in September 1894, winning decisive victories on both occasions. Following the victory at Pyongyang the Japanese Second Army under Marshal Ōyama Iwao (1842–1916) moved northward towards Manchuria, the plan being to seize Port Arthur, headquarters to China's Beiyang Fleet and a highly fortified city that dominated the sea passage from Korea to northeast China. In September the Japanese Navy heavily damaged the Beiyang Fleet at the Battle of the Yalu River, though the Chinese troopships were successful in landing their troops not far from the Sino-Korean border. With the Beiyang Fleet defeated, the Japanese Navy began a siege of Port Arthur while the Japanese Second Army advanced on the city through Manchuria and the Japanese First Army crossed the Yalu River to form another advance by land. After a series of battles on the Liaodong Peninsula the First Division of the Second Army, led by General Yamaji, drew up around Port Arthur in late November. On 18 November 1894, the Japanese movement down the peninsula was temporarily frustrated and returned to find that their abandoned wounded troops had been severely mutilated, with hands and feet cut off. Others had been burned alive. The city was evacuated with residents fleeing westward by land or sea into China.  The Qing government placed bounties on prisoners of war, or their heads or other body parts; during the Sino-Japanese War the bounty was 50 taels.  Some Chinese soldiers had mutilated several Japanese soldiers' dead bodies and displayed them at the entrance of the city, infuriating the Japanese. Several vowed revenge, including Lieutenant Kijirō Nanbu.  After only token resistance, the city fell to Japanese troops late on the morning of 21 November. What followed was a massacre of the remaining inhabitants of Port Arthur by the Japanese troops.

Massacre
Japanese troops entered Port Arthur at about 2:00 p.m.  Upon seeing the mutilated remains of their fallen comrades, they took to killing those who remained in the town.  Several accounts of the events were recorded by members of the Japanese forces, such as the following by a member of the 1st Division:

The massacre lasted the next few days, and was witnessed by several Western observers, including James Creelman and Frederic Villiers.  Thomas Cowan, correspondent for The Times, described what he saw:

Death toll

The scale and nature of the killing continues to be debated. Japanese participants reported mountains of corpses, yet the number of dead was difficult to calculate; Cowan said it was difficult to tell if the corpses numbered in the hundreds or thousands. According to a scouting report sent to Viceroy Li Hongzhang by the local official Liu Hanfang (劉含芳) soon after the massacre, 2,600~2,700 civilians were slaughtered within the city. However, much more were slaughtered in the hills surrounding the city but they had no reliable count. In 1948, the Chinese Communist Party built a cemetery "万忠墓" and marked the total deaths to be 20,000, which include soldiers killed in action and fleeing soldiers disguised as civilians. The 20,000 figure became the orthodox figure in Chinese communist sources.

Creelman asserted up to 60,000 were killed, with only 36 spared, and even some late-20th century Japanese sources repeat the figure of 60,000. Stewart Lone discredited Creelman's claim, citing "the entire city population was not massacred, however, is suggested by the speed with which Port Arthur's streets again filled after the Japanese occupation: had the civilian population been literally decimated or destroyed, it is unlikely that others would have ventured to trade and work under Japanese occupation."

Aftermath
The string of Japanese victories at Pyongyang and then at the Battle of the Yalu River had increased what had until then been only lukewarm Western interest in the war. By the time of the assault on Port Arthur, a number of Western reporters were attached to the Japanese Second Army. Western reporting on the massacre was controversial.  Most correspondents such as James Creelman, writing for the New York World, and Frederic Villiers, a writer and illustrator for the London Black and White, described a wide scale and cold-blooded massacre, while Amédée Baillot de Guerville alleged in the pages of the New York Herald that no such massacre had occurred. Writing a decade later, de Guerville amended this view, claiming that though some 120 civilians were killed it still had not been a massacre.

Foreign reporters had to wait until they had left the area before they could file their stories, which the Japanese censors would otherwise have suppressed.  At first, the incident garnered little attention: a one-sentence report in The Times on 26 November stated: "Great slaughter is reported to have taken place."
The American [sic] James Creelman was the first to report on the massacre in a front-page article that declared:

Other newspapers soon followed with detailed reports.  The reports hurt Japan's international image and threatened the progress of negotiations with the United States to bring an end to the unequal treaties Japan had been made to sign in the 1850s.  Japanese Foreign Minister Mutsu Munemitsu announced an investigation, publishing these intentions in the New York World, and promised not to interfere with foreign correspondents.  On 16 December, the Foreign Ministry released a statement to the press, asserting the atrocities were exaggerations:

The Japanese press generally avoided reporting on the massacre, or dismissed it, as when the  called allegations "an invidious desire to detract from the glory of the Japanese Army".   The  accused Westerners of exaggerating the extent of the atrocities, and of hypocrisy in light of the atrocities they had committed throughout the East, stating that "the history of savage nations that have come in contact with Christian Occidentals is all but written in blood".  Some questioned Creelman's reliability, and a rumour spread that he left for Shanghai after the fall of Port Arthur to work for the Chinese government.   The Japan Weekly Mail, on the other hand, castigated the Japanese army in several articles.  Attempts to launch an inquiry met resistance from those who wanted it covered up.  The inquiry resulted in no punishments given out.

Domestic instability kept the Chinese government under pressure to conceal the defeat, rather than castigate the Japanese for the atrocities.  The China Gazette reported on the attempted cover-up: "Telegraphic notices have been sent ... all over the empire by the officials saying that a wicked report has been set on foot by the enemy that they have captured Port Arthur, but it was utterly untrue, the place being garrisoned by 30,000 brave Chinese soldiers who would never give it up to the Japanese."  As late as a month later, the China Gazette reported the defeat remained unknown even to many government officials.  The pro-Japanese North-China Herald attempted to defend the perpetrators of the massacre by proposing "The circumstances were such as might have taxed the control of any invading force."

The incident strained the delicate foreign relations Japan had been dealing with.  The war itself hurt Japan's relations with Britain, and threatened to hurt Japan's renegotiation of treaties with the US.  The incident coloured Western perceptions of Japan as barbarians under a thin veil of civilization.  These perceptions contributed to anti-Japanese sentiments in North America in the early 20th century, which would continue through World War II.

See also
List of massacres in China

Notes

Works cited

Further sources
 Allan, James. Under the Dragon Flag. London: William Heinemann, 1898. (This purports to be a true account of the massacre by a young Englishman who had been trapped in the city at the time of its fall.)
 Creelman, James. On the Great Highway, the Wanderings and Adventures of a Special Correspondent. Boston:Lothrop Publishing, 1901.
 De Guerville, A. B. Au Japon. Paris: Alphonse Lemerre, 1904.
 De Guerville, A. B. "In Defense of Japan. The Alleged Atrocities at Port Arthur Denied", Leslie’s Weekly (3 January 1895).
 Dorwart, Jeffrey M. "James Creelman, the New York World and the Port Arthur Massacre", Journalism Quarterly, 50 (4) (1973):697–701. 
 Hardin, Thomas L. “American Press and Public Opinion in the First Sino-Japanese War", Journalism Quarterly, 50 (1) (1973):53–59.
 Kane, Daniel C. "Each of Us in His Own Way: Factors Behind Conflicting Accounts of the Massacre at Port Arthur," Journalism History, vol. 31 (1) (Spring 2005):23–33.  
 Villiers, Frederic, The Truth about Port Arthur The North American Review, vol. 160, no. 460 (March 1895):325–331.

1894 in China
1894 in Japan
Conflicts in 1894
Mass murder in 1894
November 1894 events
Massacres in 1894
First Sino-Japanese War
History of Dalian
Massacres committed by Japan
Anti-Chinese violence in Asia
Japanese war crimes
War crimes in China
Massacres in China
1894 murders in China